Lysimachia × commixta is a hybrid of flowering plants in the primrose family Primulaceae. It is native to eastern North America, from eastern Canada across the Great Lakes region west to Minnesota. The hybrid specific epithet commixta means "mixed together, mixed up", which presumably refers to the genetic mixing of two species. Indeed, the hybrid is sometimes referred to as the mixed loosestrife or the commingling loosestrife.

Description

The parents of Lysimachia × commixta are L. terrestris and L. thyrsiflora. The hybrid has a terminal raceme subtended by similar lateral racemes. Although it shows a floral morphology approaching L. thyrsiflora, the hybrid is often confused with L. terrestris, which also has a terminal raceme. The length of the terminal raceme, the length of its pedicel, and the length of the filaments may be used to distinguish L. terrestris from L. × commixta.

Taxonomy

Lysimachia × commixta was first collected (as L. terrestris) by H. Eggert in 1878 in St. Clair County, Illinois. It was described by Merritt Lyndon Fernald in 1950 based on an earlier report by Fernald and Karl McKay Wiegand published in 1910. However, Fernald did not provide a Latin description of the hybrid and so technically the name is invalid.

Distribution

The distribution of Lysimachia × commixta coincides with that of its parents. The hybrid ranges from eastern Canada, across New England, New York, and the Great Lakes region, extending as far west as Minnesota.

Lysimachia × commixta is local in distribution. The parents may or may not be found in the vicinity of hybrid populations. For example, the populations in St. Clair County, Illinois, discovered by Eggert in 1878, appear to be extra-parental in range. The hybrid's expansion into southern Illinois is thought to be a result of vegetative propagation along the Mississippi River lowlands.

References

External links

 
 
 
 

commixta
Plants described in 1950
Taxa named by Merritt Lyndon Fernald
Plant nothospecies